Admiral Peary Area Vocational-Technical School is a public school, specializing in vocational education for students of eight participating High Schools in central and northern Cambria County, Pennsylvania. There are 17 shops available to students in grades 10-12. The school is located in Ebensburg, Pennsylvania.

Participating high schools and school districts

 Bishop Carroll High School
 Blacklick Valley School District
 Cambria Heights School District
 Central Cambria School District
 Conemaugh Valley School District
 Northern Cambria School District
 Penn Cambria School District
 Portage Area School District

School history
Ground was broke on the school on July 18, 1971, but due to extended construction strikes, the school was not completed in time for the 1972-73 school term. Until the school was completed, the school held classes at two temporary sites near Ebensburg. The school was completed around November 17, 1972, with only five of the current eight schools participating. The school was named for Admiral Robert E. Peary, who was raised in nearby Cresson.

External links
 Admiral Peary Vocational Technical School

Educational institutions established in 1971
Schools in Cambria County, Pennsylvania
Vocational education in the United States
1971 establishments in Pennsylvania